Samir R. Das is an Indian-American Stony Brook University professor who attended Jadavpur University and Indian Institute of Science. He was also associated with Indian Statistical Institute in Kolkata. He obtained his Ph.D. from the Georgia Institute of Technology. He was former faculty in University of Texas at San Antonio and University of Cincinnati where he conducted research in computer science particularly in wireless networking. As of 2017 his work Ad hoc on-demand distance vector (AODV) was cited over 26,000+ times. Many of his research works are highly cited, giving him an h-index of 54.

References

Living people
20th-century births
American computer scientists
Georgia Tech alumni
University of Cincinnati faculty
Academic staff of the Indian Statistical Institute
Indian Institute of Science alumni
Year of birth missing (living people)
Scientists from West Bengal